The Murray Trophy – Glasgow is a professional tennis tournament played on indoor hard courts. It is currently part of the ATP Challenger Tour. It is held annually in Glasgow, United Kingdom since 2018.

Past finals

Singles

Doubles

External links
Official website

 
ATP Challenger Tour
Hard court tennis tournaments
Recurring sporting events established in 2018
International sports competitions in Glasgow
Tennis tournaments in Scotland